Bestia de Cardo (English Title: Beast of Cardo) is a feature film written by, directed and starring the actress/filmmaker Virginia Sánchez Navarro. The film was shot in 2013 in the Dominican Republic and production was finished in 2014. The cast includes Navarro and the Mexican actors Angélica Aragón (The Crime of Father Amaro, A Walk in the Clouds) and Jorge Luis Moreno (Criósfera, Niñas Mal, El Estudiante) and the Dominican actors Cheddy García, Karina Noble, Héctor Then, Sara Jorge, Mario Peguero, Christian Alvarez and Johnnie Mercedes.

The film was funded through the Dominican Film Law which attracts private investment into the local film industry.

In 2015, the film was screened at the Cinequest Film Festival.

Plot
Bestia de Cardo is a melancholy study of social pressure.  It tells the story of Moira, a wealthy, Dominican young woman with a history of mental delusions, who is forced to return permanently to her hometown, Cardo, to the two-faced society that she had left behind.

Moira is ill-tempered but spineless, and she  follows her parents’ orders, helping them to gain prestige so that their upcoming traditional new year’s eve party will be successful. However, she makes a mistake that endangers her family’s reputation even more.

Moira befriends a tailor, Hermes, who urges her to flee the town by supernatural means. As they put their plans in action, Moira and Hermes find themselves drawn to one another. The people of Cardo are unforgiving, and escape seems improbable.

Cast
Virginia Sánchez Navarro (Moira Cruz-Daruich)
Angélica Aragón (Victoria Daruich)
Jorge Luis Moreno (Hermes)
Cheddy García (Melody)
Karina Noble (Onelia Nocci)
Héctor Then (The Man)
Mauricio Bustamante (Crazy Clock)
Jhonnie Mercedes (Chauffeur)
Omar Ramírez (Omar Cruz)
Sarah Jorge (Sara)
Christian Alvarez (Guillermo)
Raquel Estevez (Laura)
Mario Peguero (Paul)
Bernardita García (Magaly)
Paolo Modolo (Sergio Nocci)
Jalsen Santana (Sara's husband)
Mabel Santos (Cocó)

Release
Bestia de Cardo had its world premiere at the 21st Austin Film Festival hosted from October 23 to 30, 2014.

References

External links

2014 films
Films shot in the Dominican Republic